Aldbrough  Beck is a small beck in North Yorkshire, England.

The beck starts near Eppleby, in the Richmondshire district, and flows southeast, joining the Mary Wild Beck.  It passes under a packhorse bridge while passing through Aldbrough St John.  One  mile further on the stream becomes known as Clow Beck and flows seven miles more, joining the River Tees near Croft-on-Tees.

References 

Aldborough Beck